Natinga means being "forced" in Didinga language. It is a place that was used to accommodate the Internally Displaced people (IDPS) during Sudan civil war and a school that was established in 1993 in South Sudan for boys forced from their homes by the Second Sudanese Civil War.
It is the center of a payam in Kapoeta East County of Eastern Equatoria.

Location

Natinga is in a small village at the base of the foothills of the Losolia Mountains.
It is just north of the Kenyan border.
These are the mountains where John Garang de Mabior, founder and wartime leader of Sudan People's Liberation Army (SPLA) died in a helicopter accident in 2005. The village is near the scene of the crash.
Natinga is inhabited by the Didinga people.

Arrivals and departures

In March 1993 Moli Tokoro and Borongoli camps were evacuated for Natinga after the National Islamic Front had made advances in the south. The route led through Palotaka, where about 800 of the unaccompanied minors decided to settle.
In some cases the SPLA appears to have recruited boys as fighters. 
There were 2,800 unaccompanied boys at the school in Natinga in August 1994. By March 1995 only 600 boys were left.  By June the number of unaccompanied boys had risen again to 1,700.
In 2000 the Sudanese NGO JARRAD was given help by USAID in an effort to airlift an estimated 4,000 Internally Displaced People (IDPs) from the camps of Natinga, Narus and New Cush, returning them to their home areas in Bor County. There were delays getting started, and many of the IDPs moved to Kakuma camp in Kenya instead.

References

Further reading

Populated places in Eastern Equatoria